Caitlin Connolly is an American painter and sculptor.

Connolly grew up in Utah with three brothers. Her mother was a flute teacher and Connolly began playing the flute when she was five years old. Connolly obtained a BFA in painting and drawing from the University of Utah in 2009.

Career
Connolly’s art career began to blossom as she began having work appear in galleries, shows, and on book covers. Connolly explains, “Art often becomes my medium for exploring purpose in life and moments of truth.” Connolly struggled with infertility for seven years and the themes of struggle, motherhood, and female empowerment run through her artwork. The shape of an upward-pointing triangle sometimes permeates Connolly’s work and became a subtle nod to the female figure with a woman’s shape rendered as an upward-pointing triangle. 

Connolly has been commissioned to create artwork for numerous books including Our Heavenly Family, Our Earthly Families and Women at Church: Magnifying LDS Women’s Local Impact. In 2020, she was included in an art show of 35 Utah artists, age 35 and under, at the Finch Lane Gallery that was notable for being left unseen during the COVID-19 pandemic.

Personal life
Connolly is married to musician Robbie Connolly of Fictionist and The Killers. She is a member of the Church of Jesus Christ of Latter-day Saints. The couple have two children and live in Provo, Utah.

References

External links
 Caitlin Connolly Official Website
 Radio West Films Go to your room: The art of Caitlin Connolly

Living people
21st-century American painters
University of Utah alumni
Year of birth missing (living people)
Latter Day Saints from Utah
People from Provo, Utah
Latter Day Saint artists
American Latter Day Saint artists